Cicero was launched at Hull in 1819 as a Greenland whaler, hunting bowhead whales. She made six full voyages to the Greenland whale fishery and was lost in July 1826 on her seventh.

Career
Cicero first appeared in Lloyd's Register (LR) in 1819 with Parkin, master, Raith & Co., owner, and trade Hull-Greenland.

Whaling voyages
The following data is from Coltish:

Fate
Cicero, Lee, master, was lost on 1 July 1826 in the Davis Strait.  rescued her crew. 

By another report, Cicero was destroyed by taking the "Middle Ice" in Latitude 75°12′ North, at midnight 7 June 1826.

Citations and references
Citations

References
 

1819 ships
Ships built in Kingston upon Hull
Age of Sail merchant ships of England
Whaling ships
Maritime incidents in July 1826